Snowboarding is an Olympic sport that has been contested at the Winter Olympic Games since the 1998 Winter Olympics in Nagano, Japan. Snowboarding was one of five new sports or disciplines added to the Winter Olympic programme between 1990 and 2002, and was the only one not to have been a previous medal or demonstration event. In 1998, four events, two for men and two for women, were held in two specialities: the giant slalom, a downhill event similar to giant slalom skiing; and the half-pipe, in which competitors perform tricks while going from one side of a semi-circular ditch to the other. Canadian Ross Rebagliati won the men's giant slalom and became the first athlete to win a gold medal in snowboarding. Rebagliati was briefly stripped of his medal by the International Olympic Committee (IOC) after testing positive for marijuana. However, the IOC's decision was reverted following an appeal from the Canadian Olympic Association. For the 2002 Winter Olympics, the giant slalom was dropped in favour of the parallel giant slalom, an event that involves head-to-head racing. In 2006, a third event, the snowboard cross, was held for the first time. In this event, competitors race against each other down a course with jumps, beams and other obstacles.

Eleven athletes have won three medals: Americans Shaun White, Jamie Anderson, Lindsey Jacobellis and Kelly Clark, as well as Canadians Max Parrot and Mark McMorris, Japanese Ayumu Hirano, Austrian Benjamin Karl, Slovenian Žan Košir, New Zealander Zoi Sadowski-Synnott and Russian Vic Wild. Out of these athletes, only White has won three gold medals. 



Men

Big air

Halfpipe

Giant slalom (discontinued)

Parallel giant slalom

Parallel slalom (discontinued) 

the color purple

Snowboard cross

Slopestyle

Women

Big air

Halfpipe

Giant slalom (discontinued)

Parallel giant slalom

Parallel slalom (discontinued)

Snowboard cross

Slopestyle

Mixed

Snowboard cross team

Statistics

Athlete medal leaders

Medals per year
Key

 Numbers in bold indicate most medals won at those Olympic Games.

Medal sweep events
These are podium sweep events in which athletes from one NOC won all three medals.

See also 
 FIS Snowboard World Championships
 X Games

References 
General
 ** 1998
 

 Specific

External links 
 Snowboarding – Olympics at Sports-reference.com
 Olympic Review and Revue Olympique. LA84 Foundation

Snowboarding
medalists